The Shillong Observer was an English-language fortnightly newspaper published from Shillong, India. It was an organ of the Communist Party of India. Prafulla Misra was the editor of the newspaper.

References

English-language communist newspapers
English-language newspapers published in Asia
Communist Party of India
Communist periodicals published in India
Publications with year of establishment missing